Tanimetua Harry (born 1950) is a former international lawn bowler from the Cook Islands.

Bowls career
Harry has represented the Cook Islands at two Commonwealth Games; in the fours at the 1990 Commonwealth Games and in the singles at the 1998 Commonwealth Games.

She won a triples bronze medal (with Porea Elisa and Tremoana Damm) at the 1995 Asia Pacific Bowls Championships.

References

1950 births
Living people
Bowls players at the 1990 Commonwealth Games
Bowls players at the 1998 Commonwealth Games
Cook Island female bowls players